was a major Japanese bank based in Osaka and a central component of the Sumitomo Group. It merged with Sakura Bank on April 1, 2001 to form Sumitomo Mitsui Banking Corporation.

History
Sumitomo Bank was established as a private enterprise in November 1895 and reorganized as a limited company with 15 million yen of capital in March 1912. It opened numerous overseas branches during the World War I era as the Sumitomo zaibatsu business globalized.

After World War II, the Sumitomo group was dismantled and its constituent companies were forbidden from using the Sumitomo name. The bank renamed itself Osaka Bank in October 1948. In December 1952, its name was changed back to Sumitomo Bank. Sumitomo was the main bank for several major Japanese manufacturers during the early postwar era, including NEC and Panasonic (Matsushita).

In the 1970s, it lost nearly $1 billion in the restructuring of Osaka-based general trading company Ataka & Co., which, combined with the contemporaneous bailout of Mazda, had a major impact on Sumitomo's finances, driving it down from the most profitable bank in Japan to being only ninth-ranked. However, the Ataka and Mazda bailouts enhanced Sumitomo's industry reputation by showing its dedication to customers. It became the largest Japanese bank by deposits until the merger of Dai-Ichi Bank and Nippon Kangyo Bank to form Dai-Ichi Kangyo Bank.

In 1986, Sumitomo merged with Heiwa Sogo Bank in order to expand its presence in the Tokyo area. In the same year, it acquired 12.5% of Goldman Sachs.

Sumitomo incurred major losses during the collapse of the Japanese asset price bubble in the 1990s. In 1993, it wrote off 100 billion yen in bad loans, and in 1994 its Nagoya branch manager was murdered in possible connection with a bad debt collection. In 1995, it posted the first net loss of a major Japanese bank in the postwar era. It sold Sumitomo Bank of California, the sixth-largest bank in California, at a steep discount to Zions Bancorporation in 1998 (SBC is now part of California Bank and Trust).

In 1999, amid intensifying competition as other Japanese and foreign banks consolidated, Sumitomo announced its merger with Sakura Bank to form Sumitomo Mitsui Banking Corporation. The merger was approved in June 2000 and combined Sakura's strong retail operation and eastern Japan presence with Sumitomo's strong wholesale operation and western Japan presence. The merger created the world's third-largest banking group at the time, after Deutsche Bank and the pending merger that would form Mizuho Bank.

Sumitomo's SWIFT code was "SMITJPJT."

Notable alumni
Daizo Kusuda, member of the House of Representatives
Ichiro Miyashita, member of the House of Representatives

References

Defunct banks of Japan
Companies formerly listed on the Tokyo Stock Exchange
Companies formerly listed on the London Stock Exchange
Banks established in 1895
Banks disestablished in 2001
2001 mergers and acquisitions
Sumitomo Mitsui Financial Group
Japanese companies established in 1895